Tea Ware Pictorial (茶具圖贊/茶具图赞) is a book by Shenan (Chinese: 審安老人/审安老人) compiled in 1269, and is the earliest picture book on tea ware used in preparation of Song dynasty tea cake for drinking.

Tea during the Song Dynasty was prepared by using the whisking tea method. The green tea was ground into a fine powder and hot water was added then whisked in a bowl with a brush to make tea and foam, this Chinese method of preparing tea spread to Japan and became the way Matcha tea is made in Japan today. While in China this method gave way to the brewing tea method, which is the infusion of loose tea.

Old Man Shenan’s 12 Tea Ware
This book described 12 tea wares (審安老人的12茶具):

Some of the tea terms of Shenan and Lu Yu have the same names and use, because some of the tea wares from the Tang dynasty were also used in the Song dynasty, although Shenan does give them special names.

Brazier 風爐 (hong lu 韋鴻臚)
Crushing Block 砧椎 (mu dai zhi 木待制)
Crushing Roller 碾 (jin fa cao 金法曹)
Stone Mill 石磨 ( shi zhuan yun 石轉運 )
Gourd Scooper 瓢 (hu yuan wai 胡員外)
Sieve Box 羅合 (luo shu mi 羅樞密)
Brush 札 (zong cong shi 宗從事)
Bowl Basket 畚 (qi diao mi ge 漆雕秘閣)
Bowl 碗 (tao bao wen 陶寶文)
Water Vessel 水方 (tang ti dian 湯提點)
Tea Whisk 茶筅 (zhu fu shi 竺副師)
Tea Cloth 巾 (si zhi fang 司職方)

The above tea wares were also mentioned by Lu Yu except for stone mill (石磨) and tea whisk (茶筅) in The Classic of Tea.

See also
The Classic of Tea (Tang Dynasty)

References
Tea Terms 2010 中英文茶術語

External links
抹茶法 - Whisking (Fine powder) Tea Method

Chinese tea classic texts
Song dynasty literature
13th-century Chinese books
1269 books